Abu Abd Allah Muhammad ibn al-Husayn Ibn al-Kattani al-Madhiji (951–1029), sometimes nicknamed "al-Mutatabbib" (the physician), was a well-known Arab scholar, philosopher, physician, astrologer, man of letters, and poet.

Born in Córdoba in the Caliphate of Cordoba, he wrote books on logic, inference and deduction.

For some time he was the personal physician of Al-Mansur Ibn Abi Aamir, sultan of al-Andalus, and wrote The Treatment of Dangerous Diseases Appearing Superficially on the Body (Mu`alajat al-amrad al-khatirah al-badiyah `ala al-badan min kharij). It was cited by later writers, but thought to be now lost, until a copy of it was discovered among the manuscripts now at the National Library of Medicine. Much of the treatise is on the subject of poisonous bites.

Al-Kattani also wrote an anthology of Andalusian poetry, and became especially famous by his book on metaphor in Andalusian poetry.

He died in Saragossa in 1029.

References

Bibliography
By Ibn al-Kittani:
Kitab al-Tashbihat (translated by Wilhelm Hoenerbach 1973)
Secondary literature in Spanish:
 Bosch Vilá, J.: El Oriente Árabe en el desarrollo de la cultura de la Marca Superior; Madrid, 1954.
Tomeo Lacrué, M.: Biografía Cientifica de la Universidad de Zaragoza; Zaragoza, 1962.
Martínez Loscos, C.: Los orígenes de la Medicina en Aragón, Cuadernos de Historia J. Zurita, n.° 6–7, Zaragoza, 1958.
In German:
 Dichterische Vergleiche der Andalus-Araber. I und II by Wilhelm Hoenerbach
Review:
  Farida Abu-Haidar, Bulletin of the School of Oriental and African Studies, University of London, Vol. 37, No. 2 (1974), p. 460

External sources
Ibn Hazm of Cordova on Logic

11th-century writers from al-Andalus
Scholars from al-Andalus
Physicians from al-Andalus
951 births
1029 deaths
10th-century Arabs
11th-century Arabs
11th-century physicians
10th-century Spanish philosophers